Jakub Považanec (born 31 January 1991) is a Slovak footballer who plays as a midfielder for Jablonec.

Club career
Považanec joined Dukla Prague in 2014, signing a three-year contract with the club. He joined Jablonec in January 2017, signing a three-year contract.

International career
Považanec was first called up to the senior Slovakia squad for a 2018 FIFA World Cup qualifier against England in September 2016.

His second opportunity to mark a debut in the national team was when coach Ján Kozák called him up for two friendly fixtures held in Abu Dhabi, UAE, in January 2017, against Uganda (1–3 loss) and Sweden. However Dukla Prague refused to free him and his team mate Lukáš Štetina for the fixtures. He was subsequently replaced in the squad by Miroslav Káčer from Žilina.

References

External links
FK Dukla profile 

1991 births
Living people
Slovak footballers
Association football midfielders
FK Dukla Banská Bystrica players
Slovak Super Liga players
Czech First League players
FK Dukla Prague players
FK Jablonec players
Sportspeople from Banská Bystrica